Madonna del Sasso may refer to:
Madonna del Sasso, Piedmont, a municipality in Italy
Madonna del Sasso, Switzerland, a sanctuary